Robert Norgate may refer to:
 Robert Norgate (priest)
 Robert Norgate (sculptor)